Lorneville is a community in the Canadian province of Ontario, located within the city of Kawartha Lakes.

See also
List of communities in Ontario

Communities in Kawartha Lakes